The Battle of Maella was a battle of the First Carlist War, occurring on Monday, October 1, 1838, near the Aragonese town of Maella.   The battle was a Carlist victory and resulted in the routing of most of the Liberal forces.  

The Carlist forces were composed of some 3,500 infantrymen and 500 cavalry.  

The Liberals counted on some 5,000 infantry and 300 cavalry.  

During the fighting, Ramón Cabrera was wounded in the arm but led a desperate cavalry charge, raising the morale of his forces and throwing the Liberal forces into disarray.  The Liberal forces counterattacked, throwing the Carlist left guard into disarray.  However, Cabrera led four companies of infantry and defeated the Liberal forces.  Pardiñas also attempted to rally his troops, but was unsuccessful, and he died in combat.  

The Liberals retreated to Caspe.

Sources
Córdoba, Buenaventura: "Vida militar y política de Ramón Cabrera"; Tomo III. 1844
Calbo y Rochina, Dámaso: “Historia de Cabrera y de la guerra civil en Aragón Valencia y Murcia”. 1845
Pirala, Antonio: "Historia de la Guerra Civil y de los partidos liberal y carlista". 1853
Ferrer Dalmau, Melchor: "História del Tradicionalismo español"; Tomo XIII. 1947

Maella, Battle of
Maella
Maella
October 1838 events
1838 in Spain